is a Japanese professional ice hockey center who currently plays for the Nikkō Ice Bucks in the Asia League

Saito previously played in 2001 to 2002, at amateur level, for the Komazawa Tomakomai before joining Oji Seishi in 2002 who changed their name to Oji Eagles one year later. He played for Oji until 2013 when he joined the Nikkō Ice Bucks.

Saito has also played for the Japan national team (U18, U20 & Senior) since 2000. He played in the 2002 IIHF World Championship.

References

Eagles player profile

1983 births
People from Kushiro, Hokkaido
Japanese ice hockey centres
Living people
Sportspeople from Hokkaido
Asian Games gold medalists for Japan
Medalists at the 2003 Asian Winter Games
Medalists at the 2007 Asian Winter Games
Nikkō Ice Bucks players
Oji Eagles players
Asian Games medalists in ice hockey
Ice hockey players at the 2003 Asian Winter Games
Ice hockey players at the 2007 Asian Winter Games